The Law They Forgot is a 1938  Argentine musical film drama directed by José A. Ferreyra. The film premiered in Buenos Aires.

External links

1938 films
1930s Spanish-language films
Argentine black-and-white films
Films directed by José A. Ferreyra
1930s musical drama films
Argentine musical drama films
1938 drama films
1930s Argentine films